The second season of Adventure Time, an American animated television series created by Pendleton Ward, premiered on Cartoon Network on October 11, 2010 and concluded on May 2, 2011, and was produced by Frederator Studios and Cartoon Network Studios. The season follows the adventures of Finn, a human boy, and his best friend and adoptive brother Jake, a dog with magical powers to change shape and size at will. Finn and Jake live in the post-apocalyptic Land of Ooo, where they interact with the other main characters of the show: Princess Bubblegum, The Ice King, Marceline the Vampire Queen, Lumpy Space Princess, and BMO.

After the first, the second season of Adventure Time was quickly ordered by Cartoon Network. However, the beginning of the series debuted under production constraints, and "It Came from the Nightosphere" aired after just barely being finished. The season was storyboarded and written by Adam Muto, Rebecca Sugar, Kent Osborne, Somvilay Xayaphone, Cole Sanchez, Benton Connor, Jesse Moynihan, Ako Castuera, and Tom Herpich.

The first episode of the season, "It Came from the Nightosphere" was watched by 2.001 million viewers; this marked a decrease in viewers watching Cartoon Network when compared to the previous season's debut, although it marked an increase when compared to the last season's finale. The season ended with the episode "Heat Signature" on May 9, 2011. It was viewed by 1.975 million viewers, which marked an increase from the first-season finale. The season was initially supposed to end with the cliffhanger two-parter "Mortal Folly"/"Mortal Recoil." Still, due to a scheduling error, "Heat Signature" was the last episode to air for the season. In 2011, Adventure Time was nominated for an Annie Award, and the episode "It Came from the Nightosphere" was nominated for a Primetime Emmy Award for Outstanding Short-format Animated Program. Neither the series nor the episode won, however. Several compilation DVDs that contained episodes from the season were released after the season finished airing. The complete season set was released on June 4, 2013, on DVD and Blu-ray.

Development

Concept
The season follows the adventures of Finn the Human, a human boy, and his best friend Jake, a dog with magical powers to change shape and grow and shrink at will. Finn and Jake live in the post-apocalyptic Land of Ooo, wherein they interact with the other major characters, including Princess Bubblegum, The Ice King, Marceline the Vampire Queen, Lumpy Space Princess, and BMO. Common storylines revolve around: Finn and Jake discovering strange creatures, battling the Ice King, and battling monsters to help others. Various other episodes deal with Finn attempting to understand his attraction towards Bubblegum. Two of the season's final episodes, "Mortal Folly"/"Mortal Recoil", expand the mythology of the show by introducing the Lich (voiced by Ron Perlman), who would become the show's main antagonist.

Production
After Adventure Time debuted on April 5, 2010, with "Slumber Party Panic" and "Trouble in Lumpy Space", the series was quickly renewed for a second season of 26 eleven-minute segments. Around August 2010, the writing for the second season was finished, and the production staff had started to receive bits of animation from the show's overseas animation staff. The first episode to enter into production was "Loyalty to the King", based on its production code. However, it was later temporarily shelved, and aired as the season's third episode. The third episode produced, "It Came from the Nightosphere", was instead chosen to open the season. When the network announced the start of season two, the episode was not finished. On the official Frederator site, contributor Eric Homan noted that he would "prefer [that the series] stock up on a few episodes before jumping into season two, but it ain't my network". The episode was the first episode storyboarded by Rebecca Sugar. During the network pitch of the episode, Ward beatboxed and Sugar played ukulele and the two performed "The Fry Song". Sugar later called the experience "super terrifying", although the network did green-light the episode.

This season's episodes were produced in a process similar to those of the previous season. Each episode was outlined in two-to-three pages that contained the necessary plot information. These outlines were then handed to storyboard artists, who created full storyboards. Design and coloring were done at Cartoon Network Studios in Burbank, California, and animation was handled overseas in South Korea by Rough Draft Korea and Saerom Animation. The exception to this is the sixteenth episode, "Guardians of Sunshine", which features roughly 5 minutes of 3-D animation that emulates the style of 8-bit video games. For these segments, the series asked animator Ke Jiang for assistance; he single-handedly "modeled, rigged and animated" the sequence. The Marvelous Misadventures of Flapjack creator Thurop Van Orman was brought in to work on the season as supervising producer and outline writer when his show entered a hiatus, but left shortly after Flapjack wrapped up production in order to concentrate on other projects.

Storyboarded artists for the season included Adam Muto, Sugar, Kent Osborne, Somvilay Xayaphone, Cole Sanchez, Benton Connor, Jesse Moynihan, Ako Castuera, and Tom Herpich. Conner had just finished a job working on the series The Marvelous Misadventures of Flapjack and had subsequently taken on a job as a storyboard artist for Regular Show. However, due to scheduling delays, he was free to work on two episodes of Adventure Time—"Blood Under the Skin" and "Slow Love"—as a freelance storyboard artist.  The season was the last to feature creative director Patrick McHale in a full-time capacity.  He was still credited with being part of the story writing team with the premiere of season three, but his level of contribution was more limited than it had been for the first two seasons.

Cast

The voice actors for the season include Jeremy Shada (Finn the Human), John DiMaggio (Jake the Dog), Tom Kenny (The Ice King), Hynden Walch (Princess Bubblegum), and Olivia Olson (Marceline the Vampire Queen). Ward himself provides the voice for several minor characters, as well as Lumpy Space Princess. Former storyboard artist Niki Yang voices the sentient video game console BMO, as well as Jake's girlfriend Lady Rainicorn in Korean. Polly Lou Livingston, a friend of Pendleton Ward's mother, Bettie Ward, plays the voice of the small elephant Tree Trunks. Season two would also introduce The Lich, the principal series antagonist in the episode "Mortal Folly." The Lich is portrayed by Ron Perlman. The Adventure Time cast records their lines together as opposed to doing it individually. This is to capture more natural-sounding dialogue among the characters. Hynden Walch has described these group sessions as akin to "doing a play reading—a really, really out there play."

The series also regularly employs guest voices for various characters. For instance, in the episode "It Came from the Nightosphere", Martin Olson—Olivia Olson's real-life father—appears as Marceline's father, Hunson Abadeer. Peter Stormare appears as Sir Slicer in the episode "Blood Under the Skin". In the entry "Storytelling", Sam Marin voiced the Teenaged Bear. Rapper Biz Markie guest starred as Snorlock in the installment "Slow Love". Paul Reubens appeared as the Gnome Ruler in "Power Animal". Stephen Root lent his voice to the Royal Tart Toter in the episode "The Other Tarts". Thurop Van Orman voiced the Tree Witch in "To Cut a Woman's Hair". Comedian Melinda Hill lends her voice to Doctor Princess in "The Chamber of Frozen Blades". Henry Rollins and Laura Silverman appeared as Lady Rainicorn's parents in the episode "Her Parents". "The Silent King" featured the voice of Michael J. Anderson, who portrayed Gummy, the Royal Goblin Chief of Staff. Finally, Miguel Ferrer appeared as Death in the episode "Death in Bloom"; Ferrer would reprise his role in the fourth-season episode "Sons of Mars". Jackie Buscarino voiced the titular character in the episode "Susan Strong". In "Belly of the Beast", Andy Samberg voiced the character Party Pat. Brian Baumgartner, Toby Huss, and Kate Micucci appeared as the three ghost friends of Marceline in "Heat Signature". "Mortal Recoil" featured Isabella Acres as a young Princess Bubblegum. Acres would reprise her role in the third season episode "Too Young".

Various other characters are voiced by Tom Kenny, Dee Bradley Baker, Maria Bamford, Steve Little, and Kent Osborne.

Broadcast and reception

Ratings
The season debuted on October 11, 2010, with the episode "It Came from the Nightosphere". The episode was watched by 2.001 million viewers. This marked a decline from the first-season premiere, which had been viewed by 2.5 million viewers, but it marked an increase from the first-season finale, which was watched by only 1.77 million viewers. "It Came from the Nightospere" also marked gains when compared to the same timeslot a year prior; for instance, 732,000 kids aged 6–11 watched the episode, an increase by 35 percent when compared to the previous year. The season hit a high with its third episode, "Loyalty to the King", which was watched by 2.541 million viewers. The season ended with "Heat Signature", which was viewed by 1.975 million viewers. The season was originally supposed to end with the two-parter "Mortal Folly"/"Mortal Recoil", but due to a scheduling conflict, "Heat Signature" was the last episode of the season aired. The season aired on Mondays at 8:00 pm, the same slot as the first season.

Reviews and accolades
The season's first episode, "It Came from the Nightosphere" was largely well received by critics. Tyler Foster of DVD Talk called it "a pretty decent example of all the notes the show can hit." He was particularly pleased with the way "the rift between Marceline and her dad is handled with a nice seriousness that fits right in alongside absurd gags about penguins". He also noted that "any episode that includes a song is a plus in my book." It was also called the "real highlight" of the eponymous DVD release by Charles Webb of MTV Geek. IGN writer Matt Fowler later referred to the episode as a "classic". The episode was later nominated for a 2011 Primetime Emmy Award for Outstanding Short-format Animated Program, although it did not win.

The series was a candidate for the "Best and Worst of 2010", a list compiled by the Bucks County Courier Times; the series was under the "Best Animated TV Show" category. Patrick Broadnax of the Huntsville Examiner named the series one of "The Most Underrated Shows on Television". He argued that, in its second season, the show was "shining as one of [Cartoon Network's] best decisions ever." He praised the spirit of the series, noting that it was reminiscent of the "charm that 90's cartoon held so gracefully". He concluded that the show was "goofy, colorful fun that should be able to put a smile on anyone's face." Tyler Foster of DVD Talk wrote that the season release was "highly recommended". He praised that the season was able to "explor[e] and [expand] on everything that" was set up in the first season of the show. He specifically praised "Power Animal, "Death in Bloom", "Crystals Have Power", and "Her Parents" as the best episodes from the set. Foster was slightly critical of the visual presentation, noting that some aliasing was present, but felt that the commentaries were an added bonus.

The show itself was nominated for an Annie Award for Best Animated Television Production for Children. However, the series did not win. The episode "It Came from the Nightosphere" was nominated for a 2011 Primetime Emmy Award for Outstanding Short-format Animated Program, although the episode did not win.

Episodes

Home media
Warner Home Video released multiple DVD volumes, such as My Two Favorite People, It Came from the Nightosphere, Jake vs. Me-Mow, Fionna and Cake, The Suitor, Princess Day, and The Enchiridion which contain episodes from the second season. All DVD releases can be purchased on the Cartoon Network Shop, and the individual episodes can be downloaded from both the iTunes Store and Amazon.com.

Full season release
The full season set was released on DVD and Blu-ray on June 4, 2013.

Notes

References

2010 American television seasons
2011 American television seasons
Adventure Time seasons